Javier Mejías Leal (born 30 September 1983) is a Spanish former professional road racing cyclist, who rode professionally between 2006 and 2017 for , and . At the age of fifteen, Mejías was diagnosed with type 1 diabetes. Mejías was born, raised, and resides in Madrid, Madrid, Spain.

Major results 
Sources:

2005
 Vuelta a Extremadura
1st Stages 1 & 4
2007
 5th Overall Vuelta a Chihuahua
1st Stage 1
 6th Gran Premio de Llodio
2010
 9th Philadelphia International Championship
2012
 3rd Grand Prix de Plumelec-Morbihan
 9th Overall Circuit de Lorraine
2014
 7th Philadelphia International Cycling Classic
2015
 7th Gran Premio di Lugano
 10th Overall Tour of Turkey
 10th Trofeo Laigueglia
2016
 2nd Overall Tour de Korea
 8th Japan Cup

References

External links 

Team Novo Nordisk: Javier Mejías

1983 births
Living people
Spanish male cyclists
Cyclists from Madrid